Laurieipterus is a genus of a eurypterid classified as part of the family Stylonuridae. It contains one species, L. elegans from the Early Silurian of Scotland.

References

Silurian arthropods of Europe
Silurian eurypterids
Stylonuroidea
Eurypterids of Europe